Amos Kipruto (born 16 September 1992) is a Kenyan long-distance runner. He won the bronze medal in the men's marathon at the 2019 World Athletics Championships. Kipruto took victory at the 2022 London Marathon.

Career
In 2016, he won the Rome Marathon, and then the Seoul Marathon a year later.

In 2018, Kipruto earned two medals at the World Marathon Majors, finishing third in Tokyo with a time of 2:06:33 and second in Berlin with 2:06:23.

He claimed the bronze medal in the men's marathon at the 2019 World Athletics Championships held in Doha, Qatar.

Kipruto represented Kenya at the delayed 2020 Tokyo Olympics.

He came second at the postponed 2021 Tokyo Marathon in March 2022 in a personal best of 2:03:13, behind only Eliud Kipchoge, who ran 2:02:40. Kipruto secured the biggest win of his career up to that point by winning the 2022 London Marathon held in October with a time of 2:04:39.

Achievements

International competitions

Personal bests 
 10 kilometres – 28:37 (Bolzano 2019)
 Half marathon – 1:00:24 (Gothenburg 2017)
 Marathon – 2:03:13 (Tokyo 2022)

References

External links
 

1992 births
Living people
Kenyan male long-distance runners
World Athletics Championships athletes for Kenya
World Athletics Championships medalists
Athletes (track and field) at the 2020 Summer Olympics
Kenyan male marathon runners
Olympic male marathon runners
Olympic athletes of Kenya
London Marathon male winners